Francis James Kimmel (born April 30, 1962) is an American former stock car racing driver. He competed primarily in the ARCA Racing Series, from 1990 through 2016. Kimmel is the most successful driver in ARCA history. He has won the ARCA championship ten times, including eight consecutive. He won the championship in 1998 and also won the 2000 through 2007 championships, and again in 2013.

Kimmel is currently the general manager for KBR Development, which fields the No. 28 Chevrolet in the ARCA Series. From after the end of his driving career in 2017 through 2019, he returned to Venturini Motorsports (the team he drove for part-time in 2015) as a crew chief and a driving coach for their drivers, such as Leilani Munter, Gavin Harlien, and Hailie Deegan.

Personal
Frank Kimmel was born in Clarksville, Indiana on April 30, 1962. His father, Bill Kimmel, Sr., was a three-time ARCA race winner. Frank resides in Borden, Indiana with his wife Donna. He has two children Holly and Frank II. He also has two years of college education. Kimmel is involved in his community, participating in school events and coaching youth sports.

Early career
Kimmel made his first career start racing a street stock at the age of 15. Seven years later he moved to late models. Before racing in ARCA, Kimmel won three championships racing Late Models.

ARCA

Kimmel's first ARCA start was in 1990. His first full season was 1992, driving the #02 Indiana Steel Co. Pontiac. Kimmel was consistent and was able to claim Rookie of the Year honors. Frank won his first race at Toledo Speedway in 1994.

He is the only ten-time champion in the ARCA Racing Series and the only driver to win eight championships in a row (2000–2007). Kimmel became the first ever ARCA Racing Series driver to be assigned a seat in the IROC (International Race of Champions) Series in 2006.

As of 2006, the crew chief on Kimmel's team is his brother, Bill Kimmel Jr.
In 2008, the Kimmel brothers left Larry Clement Racing to form their own team, known as Kimmel Racing. The team initially ran a Dodge with the support of Cunningham Motorsport and sponsorship from Riverside Auto at Daytona before joining forces with Ford Racing for the remainder of 2008.

On August 2, 2008, Kimmel was injured in a 3 car crash on lap 68 at Pocono Raceway, suffering a concussion. He was taken to the hospital for observation overnight.  Though lacking a title sponsor for the entire year of 2008, Frank and team were able to pull out a 2nd-place finish in points by a margin of 50. The loss of the championship was not the surprising part of that year but rather the surprise was how close Kimmel Racing was to winning a tenth title. As a result of his performance, Ansell and Menards joined forces with him the following season, a partnership that continues to this day.

Following the 2011 ARCA Racing Series season, Kimmel left the Kimmel Racing team, and drove for ThorSport Racing in the ARCA Racing Series starting in 2012.

On June 30, 2013, under crew chief Jeriod Prince, Kimmel tied Iggy Katona's record for most wins in the ARCA Racing Series, winning his 79th career victory at Winchester Speedway. On October 4, 2013, he clinched his tenth ARCA Racing Series championship at Kansas Speedway. Kimmel went on to win the race, surpassing Katona to become the all-time win leader in ARCA Racing Series history.

For the 2014 season, Kimmel moved to Win-Tron Racing, retaining his No. 44. His final start came in 2016.

Kimmel holds ARCA records in a number of categories, including starts, wins, and poles.

On December 20, 2019, KBR Development hired Kimmel as team general manager.

NASCAR
Kimmel made seven starts in the NASCAR Cup Series, five of those coming with Travis Carter Motorsports in 2002. He found little success in the series. His best finish to date was a 26th-place finish at Charlotte Motor Speedway. He had one Busch Series start. Through 2010 he had had two top-10 finishes from twelve Craftsman Truck Series starts. and ran the 2011 and 2013 Camping World Truck Series season finales at Homestead-Miami Speedway for ThorSport Racing.

IROC
Kimmel was invited to participate in the 2006 edition of the International Race of Champions, IROC XXX. Kimmel was the first ever ARCA Racing Series driver to be assigned a seat in IROC.

That season, he placed seventh in points with a best finish of third in the first race of the four-race IROC season.

Motorsports career results

Career summary

NASCAR
(key) (Bold – Pole position awarded by qualifying time. Italics – Pole position earned by points standings or practice time. * – Most laps led.)

Nextel Cup Series

Daytona 500

Busch Series

Camping World Truck Series

Winston West Series

ARCA Racing Series
(key) (Bold – Pole position awarded by qualifying time. Italics – Pole position earned by points standings or practice time. * – Most laps led.)

 Season still in progress
 Ineligible for series points

International Race of Champions
(key) (Bold – Pole position. * – Most laps led.)

References

External links
 

Living people
1962 births
People from Washington County, Indiana
Racing drivers from Indiana
NASCAR drivers
ARCA Menards Series drivers
International Race of Champions drivers
People from Clarksville, Indiana